Chris Provenzano is an American film and television writer. He co-wrote the story and screenplay for the motion picture Get Low.  He served as a writer on the first season of Mad Men in 2007, writing the episode "The Hobo Code" and co-writing the episode "Shoot." Alongside his colleagues on the writing staff he won a WGA award for best new series; he was also nominated for the award for best dramatic series and best episodic drama for "The Hobo Code." He served as an executive story editor on the first season of Justified in 2010, writing "Long in the Tooth" and co-writing "The Hammer."

References

External links

American male screenwriters
American television writers
Writers Guild of America Award winners
Living people
American male television writers
Year of birth missing (living people)